Gorleston (Range Rear)  Lighthouse is located near mouth of River Yare  in the Gorleston-on-Sea area of Great Yarmouth in the English county of Norfolk. The lighthouse was built in 1878. Gorleston-on-Sea lighthouse carries two lights.

Gallery

See also

 List of lighthouses in England

References

External links

 Trinity House

Lighthouses completed in 1878
Lighthouses in Norfolk
Gorleston-on-Sea
Grade II listed lighthouses
Grade II listed buildings in Norfolk